
Wood End may refer to:

United Kingdom
 Wood End, Bedfordshire - Bedfordshire  TL0004
 Wood End, Berkshire - Berkshire  SU9270
 Wood End, Buckinghamshire - Buckinghamshire  SP7930
 Wood End, Oldham - Greater Manchester  SD9309
 Wood End, Tameside - Greater Manchester  SD9702
 Wood End, Herefordshire - Herefordshire  SO6341
 Wood End, Hertfordshire - Hertfordshire  TL3225
 Wood End, Hillingdon - Greater London
 Wood End, Hayes - Greater London
 Wood End, Hampshire
 Wood End, Atherstone - Warwickshire  SP2498
 Wood End, Fillongley - Warwickshire  SP2988
 Wood End, Stratford-on-Avon - Warwickshire  SP1071
 Wood End, Coventry - West Midlands  SP3682, a district of Coventry
 Wood End, Wolverhampton - West Midlands  SJ9401

United States
 Wood End, Massachusetts - a former village of Provincetown, Massachusetts 
 Wood End Light - A lighthouse, also in Provincetown

Other uses
 Wood End Museum, in Scarborough, North Yorkshire

See also
Woodend (disambiguation)